The 2022–23 season of US Monastir is the 64th in the club's history. It is the club's third season in the Basketball Africa League (BAL). This season US Monastir was coached by Marouan Kechrid until October, when Linos Gavriel took over.

Roster 
As of 28 February 2023.

Transactions

In

Out

Games

FIBA Intercontinental Cup 
US Monastir was the first-ever Tunisian team to play in the FIBA Intercontinental Cup, and the second representative from the BAL to play in the competition.

Basketball Africa League 
US Monastir was drawn in the Sahara Conference, which was held in the Dakar Arena in Dakar, Senegal.

References 

2023 BAL season